Tubuliporina is a suborder of bryozoans in the order Cyclostomatida.  The earliest possible crown-group fossil date to the upper Triassic.

Families list
Annectocymidae
Bereniceidae?
†Celluliporidae
Cinctiporidae?
Diaperoeciidae
Diastoporidae
†Diploclemidae
Eleidae
Entalophoridae
Filisparsidae
Idmoneidae
Mecynoeciidae
Multisparsidae
Oncousoeciidae
†Phaceloporidae
Plagioeciidae
Pustuloporidae
†Spiroporidae
Stomatoporidae
Tubuliporidae

Genera incertae sedis: Supercytis

References

External links

Protostome suborders
Cyclostomatida